Leninsky Urban Settlement or Leninskoye Urban Settlement is the name of several municipal formations in Russia.

Modern urban settlements
Leninsky Urban Settlement, Sakha Republic, a municipal formation which the Settlements of Leninsky and Lebediny in Aldansky District of the Sakha Republic are incorporated as
Leninskoye Urban Settlement, a municipal formation which the Urban-Type Settlement of Leninskoye in Shabalinsky District of Kirov Oblast is incorporated as
Leninskoye Urban Settlement, a municipal formation which imeni V. I. Lenina Settlement Okrug in Baryshsky District of Ulyanovsk Oblast is incorporated as

Historical urban settlements
Leninsky Urban Settlement, Tula Oblast, a former municipal formation which the Urban-Type Settlement of Leninsky and Barsukovsky Selsoviet in Leninsky District of Tula Oblast were incorporated as before being demoted in status to that of a rural settlement in May 2014

See also
Leninsky (disambiguation)

References

Notes

Sources
Registry of the Administrative-Territorial Divisions of the Sakha Republic.

Official website of the Government of Tula Oblast. Registry of the Inhabited Localities of Tula Oblast 

